Consuelo Vanderbilt-Balsan (formerly Consuelo Spencer-Churchill, Duchess of Marlborough; born Consuelo Vanderbilt; March 2, 1877 – December 6, 1964) was a socialite and a member of the prominent American Vanderbilt family. Her first marriage to the 9th Duke of Marlborough has become a well-known example of one of the advantageous, but loveless, marriages common during the Gilded Age; as such, she was known as one of the earliest dollar princesses. The Duke obtained a large dowry by the marriage, and reportedly told her just after the marriage that he married her in order to "save Blenheim Palace", his ancestral home.

Although the teenage Consuelo was opposed to the marriage arranged by her mother, she became a popular and influential Duchess. For much of their 25-year marriage, the Marlboroughs lived separately and the marriage was finally annulled. Her first marriage produced two sons, John Spencer-Churchill, the 10th duke, and Lord Ivor Spencer-Churchill. She went on to marry the wealthy French aviator Jacques Balsan and continued her charitable endeavours.  She lived in France before World War II, when she and Balsan returned to live in New York.  When she died, she was buried near her son, Lord Ivor, not far from Blenheim Palace.

Life

Early life

Born in New York City, Consuelo Vanderbilt was the only daughter and eldest child of William Kissam Vanderbilt, a New York railroad millionaire, and his first wife, a Southern belle and budding suffragist Alva Erskine Smith (1853–1933, who later married Oliver Belmont) from Mobile, Alabama (a daughter of Murray Forbes Smith). Her Spanish name was in honor of her godmother, Consuelo Yznaga (1853–1909), a half-Cuban, half-American socialite who created a social stir a year earlier when she married the fortune-hunting George, Viscount Mandeville, a union of Old World aristocracy and New World money that caused the groom's father, the 7th Duke of Manchester, to openly wonder if his son and heir had married a "Red Indian". Consuelo and her friends were the inspiration for Edith Wharton's unfinished novel The Buccaneers.

Consuelo Vanderbilt was largely dominated by her mother, who was determined that her daughter would make a great marriage like that of her famous namesake. In her autobiography, Consuelo Vanderbilt described how she was required to wear a steel rod, which ran down her spine and fastened around her waist and over her shoulders, to improve her posture. She was educated entirely at home by governesses and tutors, and learned foreign languages at an early age. Her mother was abusive and whipped her with a riding crop for minor infractions. When, as a teenager, Consuelo objected to the clothing her mother had selected for her, Alva told her that "I do the thinking, you do as you are told."
 
Like her godmother, Consuelo Vanderbilt attracted numerous title-bearing suitors anxious to trade social position for cash. Her mother reportedly received at least five proposals for her hand. Consuelo was allowed to consider the proposal of just one of the men, Prince Francis Joseph of Battenberg, but she developed an instant aversion to him. None of the others, however, was good enough for Alva Vanderbilt, herself the daughter of a cotton broker. Consuelo Vanderbilt was considered a great beauty, with a face compelling enough to cause the playwright Sir James Barrie, author of Peter Pan, to write, "I would stand all day in the street to see Consuelo Marlborough get into her carriage." Oxford undergraduate Guy Fortescue later described how he and his friends were captivated by her "piquante oval face perched upon a long slender neck, her enormous dark eyes fringed with curling lashes, her dimples, and her tiny teeth when she smiled." She came to embody the "slim, tight look" that was in vogue during the Edwardian era.

First marriage 

Determined to secure the highest-ranking mate possible for her only daughter, a union that would emphasize the preeminence of the Vanderbilt family in New York society, Alva Vanderbilt engineered a meeting between Consuelo and the indebted, titled Charles Spencer-Churchill, 9th Duke of Marlborough, chatelain of Blenheim Palace. The matchmaker was a minor American heiress turned major English hostess, Lady Paget, the wife of Sir Arthur Paget. Born as Mary "Minnie" Stevens, Lady Paget was the daughter of Paran Stevens, the socially ambitious widow of an American hotel entrepreneur who had successfully obtained admittance to the exclusive New York society of the fabled "Four Hundred". Lady Paget, always short of money, soon became a sort of international marital agent, introducing eligible American heiresses to British noblemen.

Consuelo Vanderbilt had no interest in the duke, being secretly engaged to an American, Winthrop Rutherfurd. Her mother cajoled, wheedled, begged, and then, ultimately, ordered her daughter to marry Marlborough. When Consuelo – a docile teenager whose only notable characteristic at the time was abject obedience to her fearsome mother – made plans to elope, she was locked in her room as Alva threatened to murder Rutherfurd. Still she refused. It was only when Alva Vanderbilt claimed that her health was being seriously and irretrievably undermined by Consuelo's stubbornness and appeared to be at death's door that the malleable girl acquiesced. Alva made an astonishing recovery from her entirely phantom illness, and when the wedding took place, Consuelo stood at the altar reportedly weeping behind her veil. The duke, for his part, gave up the woman he reportedly loved back in England and collected US$2.5 million ($ in  dollars) in railroad stock as a marriage settlement. Consuelo's father built a mansion for her in London, Sunderland House in Curzon Street.

Consuelo Vanderbilt married the 9th Duke of Marlborough at St. Thomas Episcopal Church, New York City, on November 6, 1895. They had two sons, John Albert William Spencer-Churchill, Marquess of Blandford (who became 10th Duke of Marlborough), and Lord Ivor Spencer-Churchill.

The new duchess was adored by the poor and less fortunate tenants on her husband's estate, whom she visited and to whom she provided assistance. She later became involved with other philanthropic projects and was particularly interested in those that affected mothers and children. She was also a social success with royalty and the aristocracy of Britain. However, given the ill-fitting match between the duke and his wife, it was only a matter of time before their marriage was in name only. A few years into their marriage, Consuelo reconnected with Winthrop Rutherfurd and went on to spend two weeks in Paris with him, soon after she confessed to her husband that she loved Rutherford and wished to elope with him (The duke's second wife Gladys went on to imply his and Consuelo's second son Ivor was actually Rutherfurd's). In 1900, with the duke's reluctant permission, she went to London to discuss the elopement with Rutherfurd, only for him to refuse her. In despair, the Duke set off to the South African War with his cousin, Winston Churchill. He was away for six months, returning in July 1900. Upon his return, The duchess confessed to having an affair with his cousin, the Hon. Reginald Fellowes (the liaison did not last, to the relief of Fellowes's parents) She may also have had an affair with the artist Paul César Helleu, who sketched and painted her several times. The artist’s daughter believes that Helleu and Consuelo probably had an affair between 1900 and 1901, which continued after his return to Paris, where she visited him and sat for him again. By this time the duke and duchess had completely stopped being intimate, and soon the duke fell under the spell of Gladys Marie Deacon, an eccentric American of little money but, like Consuelo, dazzling to look at and of considerable intellect. 
After the Duchess' affair and planned elopement with the married Charles Vane-Tempest-Stewart, 7th Marquess of Londonderry, The Marlboroughs separated in 1906, divorced in 1921, and the marriage was annulled, at the duke's request and with Consuelo's assent, on 19 August 1926.

Though largely embarked upon as a way to facilitate the Anglican duke's desire to convert to Roman Catholicism, the annulment, to the surprise of many, also was fully supported by the former duchess's mother, who testified that the Vanderbilt–Marlborough marriage had been an act of unmistakable coercion. "I forced my daughter to marry the duke", Alva Belmont told an investigator, adding: "I have always had absolute power over my daughter." In later years, Consuelo and her mother enjoyed a closer, easier relationship.

Second marriage and later life

Consuelo's second marriage, on July 4, 1921, was to Lt. Col. Jacques Balsan, a record-breaking pioneer French balloon, aircraft, and hydroplane pilot who once worked with the Wright Brothers. Also a textile manufacturing heir, Balsan was a younger brother of Étienne Balsan, who was an early lover of Coco Chanel. Jacques Balsan died in 1956 at the age of 88.

After the annulment of her marriage to the Duke of Marlborough, she still maintained ties with favorite Churchill relatives, particularly Winston Churchill. He was a frequent visitor at her château, in Saint-Georges-Motel, a small commune near Dreux about 50 miles from Paris, in the 1920s and 1930s, where he completed his last painting before the war.

Records in Florida show that in 1932 Consuelo Vanderbilt Balsan built a home in Manalapan, Florida, just south of Palm Beach. It was designed as a love nest by Maurice Fatio. The dream home of 26,000 square feet is called Casa Alva, in honor of her mother. Although Consuelo sold the house in 1957, it still exists. Many believe that, in 1946, Churchill polished his famous Iron Curtain Speech in the Florida house, as he visited his cousin's former wife on his way to Missouri, to deliver the address at Westminster College.

Consuelo Balsan published her insightful but not entirely candid autobiography, The Glitter and the Gold, in 1953. It was ghostwritten by Stuart Preston, an American writer who was an art critic for The New York Times. A reviewer in the same paper called it "an ideal epitaph of the age of elegance."

Consuelo Balsan died at Southampton, Long Island, New York, on December 6, 1964.  She was buried alongside her younger son, Lord Ivor Spencer-Churchill, in the churchyard at St Martin's Church, Bladon, Oxfordshire, England, near her former home, Blenheim Palace.

Public service 
During World War I, Consuelo Vanderbilt worked as the chair of the Economic Relief Committee for the American Women's War Relief Fund.

During the inter-war period, she and Winaretta Singer-Polignac (the Princess de Polignac and Singer Sewing Machine heiress) worked together in the construction of a 360-bed hospital destined to provide medical care to middle class workers. The result of this effort is the Foch Hospital, located in Suresnes, a suburb of Paris, France. The hospital also includes a school of nursing and is one of the top ranked hospitals in France, especially for renal transplants. It has remained true to its origins and stayed a private not-for-profit institution that still serves the Paris community. It is managed by the Fondation médicale Franco-américaine du Mont-Valérien, commonly called Foundation Foch.

Gallery
Other images of Vanderbilt by artist Paul César Helleu:

Notes

External links

A Message to the Diocese on the Action of the Vatican Court upon the Marlborough Marriage, by William Thomas Manning, 1926
The marriage of Consuelo Vanderbilt
Video footage of Consuelo Vanderbilt

Consuelo
Consuelo
Marlborough
American people of Dutch descent
1877 births
1964 deaths
Burials at St Martin's Church, Bladon
Gilded Age
People from Manhattan